is a Japanese-American synchronized swimmer who competed in the 2004 Summer Olympics for Japan, and won a silver medal.

After the 2004 Summer Olympics, Spendlove performed for Cirque du Soleil and she renounced her Japanese citizenship in December 2015. During this time, she found her own fashion brand, Perolagua.

Spendlove is continuing synchro-swimming in mixed duet, partnering with Bill May since 2016. The pair met on their respective first national team outings in 1996. Together, they won the bronze medals in the mixed duet free routine and the mixed duet technical routine at the 2017 Synchronized Swimming World Championships.

References

External links 
 
 

1982 births
Living people
Japanese synchronized swimmers
Olympic synchronized swimmers of Japan
Olympic medalists in synchronized swimming
Olympic silver medalists for Japan
Synchronized swimmers at the 2004 Summer Olympics
Medalists at the 2004 Summer Olympics
American synchronized swimmers
World Aquatics Championships medalists in synchronised swimming
Synchronized swimmers at the 2017 World Aquatics Championships
21st-century Japanese women